Erin Cressida Wilson (born February 12, 1964) is an American playwright, screenwriter, professor, and author.

Wilson is known for the 2002 film Secretary, which she adapted from a Mary Gaitskill short story. It won her the Independent Spirit Award for Best First Screenplay and holds a rating of 75% on Rotten Tomatoes. She also wrote the screenplays for the 2006 film Fur: An Imaginary Portrait of Diane Arbus, starring Nicole Kidman; for the 2009 erotic thriller Chloe, directed by Atom Egoyan (remake of the 2003 French film Nathalie...); for the 2014 drama Men, Women & Children, co-written with its director Jason Reitman (from the novel by Chad Kultgen); and the 2016 mystery thriller The Girl on the Train, from the Paula Hawkins novel of the same name and it is her highest-grossing film to date.

Wilson has also authored dozens of plays and short works. She has taught at Duke University, Brown University, and University of California, Santa Barbara.

Early life

Education
Wilson attended San Francisco University High School and studied Theatre at Smith College, a women's college in Northampton, Massachusetts.

Filmography as screenwriter
 Secretary (2002)
 Fur: An Imaginary Portrait of Diane Arbus (2006)
 Chloe (2009)
 Call Me Crazy: A Five Film (2013)
 Men, Women & Children (2014)
 The Girl on the Train (2016)
 Snow White (2024)
 Eileen (TBA)
 Cheshire Crossing (TBA)
 Maestra (TBA)
 Indecent Proposal (TBA)
 Untitled Madonna biopic (TBA) (scrapped)

References

External links
 

Living people
American women screenwriters
American dramatists and playwrights
Independent Spirit Award winners
Writers from San Francisco
Duke University faculty
Brown University faculty
University of California, Santa Barbara faculty
21st-century American women writers
Screenwriters from California
1964 births
Screenwriters from North Carolina
Screenwriters from Rhode Island
21st-century American screenwriters
American women academics